The Moulay Bouazza plot was a 1973 conspiracy by members of the National Union of Popular Forces to overthrow King Hassan II of Morocco.

References 

1970s coups d'état and coup attempts
1973 in Morocco
Attempted coups in Morocco
Failed regicides
Republicanism in Morocco
Arab rebellions